This page shows the results of the Synchronized Swimming Competition at the 1955 Pan American Games, held from March 12 to March 26, 1955 in Mexico City, Mexico. There were three medal events in the inaugural women's synchronized swimming competition at the Pan American Games.

Solo

Duet

Team

Medal table

References
 
 
  .

1955
Events at the 1955 Pan American Games
Pan American Games
1955 Pan American Games
1955 Pan American Games